Ilanga whitechurchi is a species of sea snail, a marine gastropod mollusk in the family Solariellidae.

Description
The size of the shell attains 7.6 mm.

Distribution
This marine species occurs off the Agulhas Bank, South Africa

References

External links
 To World Register of Marine Species

whitechurchi
Gastropods described in 1932